Gargari-ye Sofla (also Romanized as Gargarī-ye Soflá and Gorgorī-ye Soflá; also known as Gargar-e Pā’īnī, Gargari Pāīni, Gargīrī-ye Pā’īn, and Gorgorī) is a village in Asiab Rural District, in the Central District of Omidiyeh County, Khuzestan Province, Iran. At the 2006 census, its population was 367, in 71 families.

References 

Populated places in Omidiyeh County